The Tangled Up Tour was the fourth concert tour by English-Irish girl group Girls Aloud. It supported their fourth studio album Tangled Up. Tour dates were announced in November 2007. Girls Aloud performed twenty-four shows at arenas across the United Kingdom and Ireland, making this tour their third to reach arenas. The tour commenced in Belfast on 3 May 2008 and concluded in Birmingham on 4 June. Girls Aloud also performed eleven open-air concerts over the summer.

The show was divided into five unique sections with distinct costumes, including the encore. The stage outfits, designed by Welsh designer Julien MacDonald, received comparisons to Madonna's Blond Ambition World Tour. Girls Aloud began the show suspended from the ceiling wearing black cloaks before performing the opening number "Sexy! No No No...". The set list mostly included songs from Tangled Up, as well as earlier singles and album tracks. A ballad section took place on a smaller stage in the centre of the arena. Billiam, Luigi Masi, and The Saturdays provided support for Girls Aloud on the tour.

The tour generated positive reviews from critics, who noted the performance as being the most sexual of Girls Aloud's career to date. The Tangled Up Tour was filmed at the O2 Arena in London on 17 May 2008 and showed live at 50 Vue cinemas across the United Kingdom. This footage was released on DVD and Blu-ray under the title Tangled Up: Live from The O2 2008 in October 2008. The tour has also been broadcast on a number of television channels.

Background and development 
The first dates were announced by various news sources towards the end of November 2007. Pre-sale tickets were offered on Girls Aloud's official website on 22 November 2007. In March 2008, Girls Aloud signed a deal to front an ad campaign for a new low-calorie Kit Kat bar called "Senses". The manufacturer sponsored the tour, and handed out chocolate bars for free at the arenas.

The announcement of the tour helped to stop rumours that the band were splitting up. The stories surfaced after Nadine Coyle pulled out of a reality television show for the second time. It was widely reported in April 2008 that Cheryl Cole was working on solo material with producer T2. These accusations were quickly denied, with Cole saying that she "had been in tour rehearsals every day." The band put a further stop to these rumours at their London show, by announcing that they would be recording a new album.

The show reportedly cost an estimated £3 million to stage, with £250,000 worth of pyrotechnics. Girls Aloud called the show their most "extravagant and rewarding" yet. Sarah Harding said that "over the years it gets bigger and more elaborate." The stage outfits were designed by Welsh designer Julien MacDonald, London-based Norwegian designer Kristian Aadnevik, and Liza Bruce. MacDonald designed "a set of crystal beaded numbers drenched in his signature sparkle" and "a collection of sci-fi inspired bodysuits." Kimberley Walsh told press that the band was "really excited about the tour" and had "loads of things planned." Luigi Masi, Billiam and The Saturdays provided support for Girls Aloud on the tour.

Girls Aloud played a number of festivals and open-air concerts over the summer. They were scheduled to perform at the Beamish Summer Festival, held at Beamish Hall in August as part of a two-day event organised by Hope 4 Kidz. However, due to weather problems, the concert was cancelled. Girls Aloud also played at Pop in the Park and 2008's V Festival. They previously performed at V Festival in 2006 with a shortened set of their Chemistry Tour.

Concert synopsis 
For the opening of the Tangled Up Tour, the band members were suspended from the ceiling wearing black cloaks. The video screen shows Cheryl Cole singing the vocodered intro to "Sexy! No No No…". Girls Aloud reached the stage as the song became more uptempo, removing their cloaks and revealing sci-fi inspired bodysuits. They then perform Tangled Up album track "Girl Overboard". During "Sound of the Underground", Girls Aloud use "semi-naked male dancers as both props and furniture. The first section of the show is finished by "Close to Love", another album track.

For the second section of the show, Girls Aloud wear black cabaret numbers. They perform "Can't Speak French", followed by "Love Machine". Album track "Black Jacks" is "performed on a rotating stage complete with a hugely energetic dance routine from both the girls and their dancers" and features a "snappy monochrome stage design." "Biology" is "slowed down slightly" and "interrupted" with a jazz interlude.

During their ballad section, Girls Aloud perform "Whole Lotta History" and "I'll Stand by You". They also perform a stripped-down cover of Robyn's "With Every Heartbeat". They originally performed the song for BBC Radio 1's Live Lounge, a recording of which is available on the "Can't Speak French" single.

Following a brief video introduction, Girls Aloud perform "Fling" in gold sequined mini-dresses. The group also perform a cover of Salt-n-Pepa's "Push It". They then perform a medley of "Wake Me Up" and "Walk This Way". Additionally, Cheryl Cole sang a "quick incerpt" of Kelis' "Trick Me" at the end of "Control of the Knife", noted by critics as a "tabloid-friendly decision." The set ends with "Call the Shots" and "Jump".

For the encore of "Something Kinda Ooooh", Girls Aloud wear high-cut Liza Bruce day-glo coloured leotards and nude fishnets amidst pyrotechnics.

Opening acts 
 The Saturdays
 Billiam
 Luigi Masi
 Stevie Hoang
 Jessie J

Setlist 
The following set list is representative of the show in May 2008. It is not representative of all concerts for the duration of the tour.
Section 1
  "Sexy! No No No..." (with video introduction)
  "Girl Overboard"
  "Sound of the Underground"
  "Close to Love"
Section 2
  "Can't Speak French"
  "Love Machine"
  "Black Jacks"
  "Biology"
Section 3
  "Whole Lotta History"
  "With Every Heartbeat"  (Robyn cover) 
  "I'll Stand By You"
Section 4
  "Fling" (with video introduction)
  "Push It"  (Salt-n-Pepa cover) 
  "Wake Me Up" / "Walk This Way"
  "Control of the Knife" (contains excerpts of "Trick Me")
  "Call The Shots"
  "Jump"
Encore
  "Something Kinda Ooooh"

Tour dates 

Cancellations and rescheduled shows

Broadcasts and recordings 

The tour was recorded on 17 May at The O2 Arena in London and shown live across 50 Vue cinemas up and down the country. Footage was released later that year when Tangled Up: Live from The O2 2008 was released on DVD and Blu-ray on 27 October 2008. In addition to the show, bonus features included a backstage documentary, music videos and trailers for the Tangled Up album. The DVD was certified gold by the British Phonographic Industry. A shortened version of the recording was shown on Channel 4 various times in December 2008.

Critical response 
The Tangled Up Tour received mostly positive reviews from contemporary music critics. The Independent gave the show four stars, saying that "even their between-song chatter is amusing". Although low points were noted, the review continued that "Girls Aloud remain confidently the only pop show in town." The Daily Record said they "pulled out all the stops." Becky Reed of Clickmusic gave the show four stars and stated, "Never mind that original banter and individual personality is lacking, the chemistry and magic is all there in the spectacle of the show."

The Mirror called it "the most sexually-charged performance of their career". Many reviews focused on Girls Aloud's provocative attire, comparing it to Madonna and Jean Paul Gaultier's famous designs for her 1990 Blond Ambition World Tour. Reed complimented the costumes: "Girls Aloud have finally moved on from the market stall clobber and now resemble the Kylie-esque superstars they deserve to be."

The Times only gave the show two stars. "The songs varied wildly in quality. While upbeat belters... tapped into the hedonistic rush of classic gay disco, too much of the set felt graceless and flat." The critique even said "the famous five could easily have been interchangeable Stepford androids." Despite having praise for the girls, Nick Levine of Digital Spy observed "one too many bum notes."

Many shows on the Tangled Up Tour sold out including two dates at the UK's most renowned venue, the O2 in London and because of the overwhelming success of the initial dates announced, more were added due to public demand.

References 

2008 concert tours
2008 video albums
2008 in British music
Concert tours of the United Kingdom
Concert tours of Ireland
Girls Aloud concert tours
Girls Aloud video albums
Live video albums